The snowboarding competition of the 1998 Winter Olympics was held at Mount Yakebitai and Kanbayashi Snowboard Park. The competition took place between 8 and 12 February 1998 and featured four events: Men's and Women's giant slalom and halfpipe.

This was the first Olympic appearance of snowboarding. Although a separate snowboard federation was established in 1994, the International Ski Federation brought snowboard under its jurisdiction with encouragement from the IOC.

Medal summary

Medal table

Men's events

Women's events

Participating nations
Twenty-two nations participated in snowboarding at the Nagano Games.

References

 
1998
1998 Winter Olympics events
1998 in snowboarding